Hoopers Lake Water Aerodrome  is located in Deerfield, Nova Scotia, Canada and is open from April to November.

References

Registered aerodromes in Nova Scotia
Transport in Yarmouth County
Buildings and structures in Yarmouth County
Seaplane bases in Nova Scotia